Claudia Elena Vásquez Ángel (born October 4, 1974) is a Colombian model, chemical engineer and beauty queen, who won the Miss Colombia 1996.

Early life 
She was born in Medellin, daughter of José Ignacio Vásquez and María Elena Ángel. She studied chemical engineering at the Pontifical Bolivarian University and represented Antioquia in Miss Colombia 1996 where she finished as the winner, making the fourth time that Antioquia obtained first place. Vasquez is found currently married to actor, singer and songwriter Carlos Vives with whom she has 2 children, Elena Vives and Pedro Vives.

References

External links
Profile for Miss Colombia website

Miss Colombia winners
Living people
Pontifical Bolivarian University alumni
1974 births
People from Medellín